Isaac Smith (1740 – August 29, 1807) was a physician, and a United States representative from New Jersey. He was the President of the Medical Society of New Jersey, and an associate justice of the Supreme Court of New Jersey.

Biography
Born in Trenton, New Jersey, he graduated from Princeton College in 1755, was a teacher in that institution from 1755 to 1758, studied medicine, and commenced practice in Trenton. In 1768 he was elected to the American Philosophical Society. He was a colonel in the Hunterdon County Militia in 1776 and 1777, serving with Lieutenant Colonel Abraham Hunt, and was elected as a Federalist to the Fourth Congress, serving from March 4, 1795 to March 3, 1797.

Smith was appointed by President George Washington a commissioner to treat with the Seneca Indians in 1797, and was an associate justice of the Supreme Court of New Jersey from 1777 to 1804. He was the first president of the Trenton Banking Co. from 1805 to 1807. He died in Trenton, New Jersey on August 29, 1807. Interment was in the First Presbyterian Churchyard.

References

External links 
 

1740 births
1807 deaths
Politicians from Trenton, New Jersey
Justices of the Supreme Court of New Jersey
Federalist Party members of the United States House of Representatives from New Jersey
Princeton University alumni
Physicians from New Jersey
Presidents of the Medical Society of New Jersey